USS Timmerman (DD-828/EDD-828/AG-152) was a  in service with the United States Navy from 1952 to 1956. She was an experimental design and was scrapped in 1959.

Design
Timmerman was originally planned as a Gearing-class destroyer in the United States Navy. Work was temporarily suspended on 7 January 1946 at 45.5% completion. She was later completed as an experimental destroyer, EDD-828. Designed to occupy the same space in standard Gearing engine spaces, Timmermans machinery was designed to generate  versus the Gearings . She had an aluminum superstructure.

Named for Grant F. Timmerman, she was laid down on 1 October 1945 at Bath, Maine, by the Bath Iron Works; assigned to the Atlantic Reserve Fleet on 19 November 1945; launched on 19 May 1951; sponsored by Mrs. Fred Timmerman; and commissioned on 26 September 1952.

Operational service 
Timmerman was constructed as an experimental, light weight, advanced design destroyer to test and evaluate, under operating conditions, advanced design experimental engineering equipment. As a unit of the Operational Development Force, 1st Naval District, Boston, Massachusetts, she tested her new propulsion system for the next four years. On 11 January 1954, her designation was changed to AG-152, a miscellaneous auxiliary ship.
 
The ship was decommissioned at Boston on 27 July 1956. She was moved to Philadelphia, Pennsylvania, in September and assigned to the Reserve Fleet. In early 1958, Timmerman was declared unfit for further service and stricken from the Navy list on 4 April 1958. On 21 April 1959, she was sold to the Boston Metals Co., Baltimore, Maryland, and scrapped.

References

  
 NavSource Naval History Photographic History of the United States Navy USS TIMMERMAN (DD-828 / EDD-828 / AG-152)

External links
Gearing-class destroyers *Destroyer History Foundation
Gearing
Gearing 

Ships built in Bath, Maine
Experimental ships of the United States Navy
Cold War destroyers of the United States
Cold War auxiliary ships of the United States
1951 ships
Gearing-class destroyers of the United States Navy

tr:Gearing sınıfı